Guy de Roye (died 1409) was a French prelate.

Biography
Originating from a noble house in Picardy, he attached himself to the Avignon popes Clement VII and Benedict XIII.  He was bishop of Verdun, Castres, and then Dol before becoming archbishop of Tours and of Sens.  He finally became archbishop of Reims in 1390.  He founded the collège de Reims in Paris, facing the collège Sainte-Barbe.  He got into a quarrel with the marshals of Volti, near Gênes, on his way to the council of Pisa with Louis I of Bar and Pierre d'Ailly, leading to a riot in which Guy was killed by a crossbow bolt.

References

Sources

 "Guy de Roye", in Marie-Nicolas Bouillet and Alexis Chassang (dir.), Dictionnaire universel d'histoire et de géographie, 1878

1409 deaths
Bishops of Castres
Bishops of Dol
Archbishops of Reims
Archbishops of Sens
Archbishops of Tours
Bishops of Verdun
15th-century French Roman Catholic bishops
14th-century French Roman Catholic bishops
Year of birth unknown
Deaths by projectile weapons
14th-century peers of France
15th-century peers of France